Michel Antunes Lugo (born 9 June 1987) is a former Brazilian professional footballer who played as a winger.

Club career

After playing for a number of clubs in Brazil, Lugo signed for Paços de Ferreira of Primeira Liga in 2011. In the following two seasons, he went back home and played for GE Bagé and União Frederiquense, before signing for Sun Hei in Hong Kong on a free transfer. He made his debut for the club in a 6–2 away defeat against Kitchee, where he also scored a goal in the 44th minute.

On 31 July 2018, Tai Po announced the signing of Lugo. On 27 April 2020, it was announced that Lugo had terminated his contract with the club over salary arrears.

Honours

Club
Tai Po
 Hong Kong Premier League: 2018–19

References

External links

1987 births
Living people
Association football forwards
Brazilian footballers
F.C. Paços de Ferreira players
Primeira Liga players
Grêmio Esportivo Brasil players
Expatriate footballers in Hong Kong
Sun Hei SC players
Eastern Sports Club footballers
Tai Po FC players
Hong Kong First Division League players
Hong Kong Premier League players